The Tenney House and Groveland Hotel is a historic site in Federal Point, Florida. It is located at 100 and 102 Commercial Avenue. On October 30, 1997, it was added to the U.S. National Register of Historic Places.

References

External links
 Putnam County listings at National Register of Historic Places
 Federal Point Florida Families
 The Groveland Hotel
 The Tenney Place

Houses on the National Register of Historic Places in Florida
National Register of Historic Places in Putnam County, Florida
Houses in Putnam County, Florida